Iva and Angu are a Canadian musical duo from Nunavut who perform Inuit throat singing. The duo, consisting of Kathleen Ivaluarjuk Merritt and Charlotte Angugaattiaq Qamaniq, released the album Katajjausiit in 2022, and received a Juno Award nomination for Traditional Indigenous Artist of the Year at the Juno Awards of 2023.

Merritt has previously performed as a collaborator with The Jerry Cans, Ptarmigan and Riit, while Qamaniq has performed with Keiino and Silla + Rise.<ref>Lynn Saxberg

References

Canadian musical duos
Musical groups from Nunavut
Inuit musical groups
Inuit throat singing